José Martínez Oya (born 14 January 1983 in Pamplona, Navarre) is a Spanish former footballer who played as a midfielder.

External links

Futbolme profile 

1983 births
Living people
Footballers from Pamplona
Spanish footballers
Association football midfielders
Segunda División players
Segunda División B players
Tercera División players
Real Jaén footballers
Atlético Madrid B players
RSD Alcalá players
Marbella FC players
Burgos CF footballers
UB Conquense footballers
Barakaldo CF footballers
CD Guadalajara (Spain) footballers
UCAM Murcia CF players
Arenas Club de Getxo footballers